Aleksandr Viktorovich Polukhin (Александр Викторович Полухин, born 15 October 1961) is a Kazakhstani water polo player. He was a member of the Kazakhstan men's national water polo team, playing as a goalkeeper.

Polukhin holds the record for the oldest water polo player to debut at the Olympics. On 13 August 2004, he made his Olympic debut at the age of 42 years and 303 days in Athens.

See also
 Kazakhstan men's Olympic water polo team records and statistics
 List of men's Olympic water polo tournament goalkeepers

References

External links
 

1961 births
Living people
Sportspeople from Almaty
Kazakhstani male water polo players
Water polo goalkeepers
Water polo players at the 2004 Summer Olympics
Olympic water polo players of Kazakhstan
Place of birth missing (living people)
Asian Games medalists in water polo
Water polo players at the 2002 Asian Games
Asian Games gold medalists for Kazakhstan
Medalists at the 2002 Asian Games